The Speaker of the House of Parliament of Sierra Leone is the presiding officer of  Parliament of Sierra Leone. The speaker is the overall leader of Parliament, and is directly elected by sitting members of the House of Parliament of Sierra Leone. Like other members of Parliament, the speaker is address as the Honourable.

The Speaker is given the constitutional power to preside over Parliament. Further, they call Members of Parliament into session, and discipline members who break the rules of Parliament. The first Speaker of the Sierra Leonean House of Parliament was the Honourable Sir Henry Josiah Lightfoot Boston who served from 1957 to 1962

List of speakers

References

External links
http://www.thisissierraleone.com/sierra-leone-re-the-speaker-of-parliament-by-dr-abdulai-o-conteh/

1957 establishments in Sierra Leone
Government of Sierra Leone
Politics of Sierra Leone
Sierra Leone
Speakers of the Parliament of Sierra Leone